The athletics competition at the 2017 Pacific Mini Games was held from the 11–14 December 2017 at the newly upgraded Korman Stadium in Port Vila, Vanuatu.

Participating nations
Eighteen teams entered athletes for the track and field competitions.

Medal table
Papua New Guinea topped the medal table, winning seventeen gold. Hosts Vanuatu were a creditable fourth with the second highest medal total overall.

Event summary
A total of 47 events were contested at the 2017 Pacific Mini Games athletics competition.

Men

Men's para-athletics

Women

Women's para-athletics

See also
 Athletics at the Pacific Games

References

Sources

 

Athletics at the Pacific Mini Games
Athletics in Vanuatu
Pacific Games
2017 Pacific Mini Games